More in Common is an American news program hosted by Michael Koenigs that airs on ABC television and Hulu. It reaches an audience of over 17 million TV households and 21 million followers across ABC's social platforms. In March 2020, the show launched a weekly spin-off series called Check In.

Format
More in Common is about "people from different backgrounds coming together in unexpected ways."

Production
On February 12, 2018, it was announced that Facebook was developing a news section within its streaming service Facebook Watch  to feature breaking news stories. The news section was set to be overseen by Facebook's head of news partnerships Campbell Brown.

On July 11, 2018, following the announcement of Facebook's initial slate of news programs, it was announced that Facebook's next roster of partners for their news section on Facebook Watch would include ABC-owned news stations. The news program the two companies developed was revealed to be titled More in Common.

On July 20, 2018, it was announced that the show would be executive produced by Michael Koenigs and that it would premiere on July 21, 2018. It was further reported that the ABC Owned Television Stations Group would feature episodes of the show on broadcast TV in major markets across the US including WABC in New York City, KABC in Los Angeles, WLS in Chicago, WPVI in Philadelphia, KGO in San Francisco, KTRK in Houston, WTVD in Raleigh/Durham, and KFSN in Fresno.

On April 3, 2021, Hulu began streaming 13 original episodes of the show to its 41 million subscribers.

References

External links

Facebook Watch original programming
2010s American television news shows
2018 American television series debuts